is a former Japanese football player. She played for Japan national team.

Club career
Nishigai was born on January 22, 1969. She played for Nikko Securities Dream Ladies and OKI FC Winds. She was selected Best Eleven in 1998 season.

National team career
On May 2, 1999, when Nishigai was 30 years old, she debuted for Japan national team against United States. She was a member of Japan for 1999 World Cup. She played 2 games for Japan in 1999.

National team statistics

References

External links
 

1969 births
Living people
Place of birth missing (living people)
Japanese women's footballers
Japan women's international footballers
Nadeshiko League players
Nikko Securities Dream Ladies players
OKI FC Winds players
1999 FIFA Women's World Cup players
Women's association football goalkeepers